Emnambithi-Ladysmith Local Municipality was a municipality in the Uthukela District Municipality, KwaZulu-Natal, South Africa.  It is accessible from the N3 and N11 national highways.

The town of Ladysmith is the economic hub of the municipality; it accommodates the municipal offices, major schools, main police station and magistrates court, as well as a variety of commercial, industrial, and retail outlets.

After municipal elections on 3 August 2016 it was merged into the larger Alfred Duma Local Municipality.

Main places
The 2001 census divided the municipality into the following main places:

Politics 
The municipal council consists of fifty-three members elected by mixed-member proportional representation. Twenty-seven councillors are elected by first-past-the-post voting in twenty-seven wards, while the remaining twenty-six are chosen from party lists so that the total number of party representatives is proportional to the number of votes received. In the election of 18 May 2011 the African National Congress (ANC) won a majority of thirty-four seats on the council.
The following table shows the results of the election.

References

External links
 Official website

Former local municipalities of South Africa